Harihar Devkota  known professionally as Shirish Devkota (born 17 July 1985) is a Nepalese folk singer.  He has released 12 of his albums and provided vocals for at least 60 more including Karuwama pani, Ma Ta Aaune Thina, Durga Ho Ki Bhawani, Maya launa milchha ra. However, his roila song (a form of Nepali folk music) Ma Ta Aaune Thina Yahi Chal Hola Bhanya Bha, released in 2008, brought him to the limelight.

Early life
He was born in Baganashakali–5, Darlamdanda, Palpa. Devkota is the son of Surya Prashad Devkota and Tulka Devi Devkota.He has two elder brothers Shambhu Devkota and Bharat Mani Devkota Born in a small village, Devkota moved to the capital, Kathmandu, to become a doctor, in 2000, where he later started singing. He released his first song Manko Kuro in 2003. In 2013, Devkota and Pashupati Sharma both became Secretary of the National Folk and Duet Song Academy, Nepal. Later in 2019, he contested with Subash Kc (his opposition for the post) for the general secretary post Most of his songs revolve around  patriotism, love, and the social situation of his country. His 2019, song Chhoro America chha was about the current situation of Nepal, where most people going abroad for higher studies do not return.

Education
Devkota has completed a Master of Business.

Connecting the film and folk song industries
Devkota has worked to connect Nepalese folk songs and the local film industry. For example, in 2015 during his stage performance on Palpa Mahotsav, he made Nepalese actor Rajesh Hamal dance in his song. In his song, Chhoro America chha which was released in 2019 Neer Shah acted as a father of a son who does not return from abroad.
In his song "Chaachara", which was released in 2018 he worked with actor Dilip Rayamajhi, who danced to the song. In his song "Chautari", released in 2020 he worked with Bandana Nepal, who danced to his song. She holds the Guinness World Record for dancing at 126 hours.)

Awards

Discography
 Ma Ta Aaune Thina Yehi Chal hola Vanya Bha - wth Devi Gharti Magar
 Durga hau ki bhawani - with Komal Oli
 Chhoro America chha - with Samjhana Bhandari
 Kharbari ma janchhu - with Bima Kumari Dura
 Karuwa ma Pani - with Bishnu Majhi
 Ballai Bheta Bhayo - with Devi Gharti Magar
 Chachara -with Rita Thapa Magar
 Chautari - with Devi Gharti Magar
 Yo Dai Feri Aaudaina - with Laxmi Dhakal 
 Tirkha Lagey Paani Dhoka Khaye Ka Jaani - with Sunita Dulal
 Talla Ghare Sannani - with Shilu
 Maaf gara -with Bishnu Majhi

References 

Living people
Nepalese folk singers
21st-century Nepalese male singers

People from Palpa District
1985 births
Dohori singers